Acrolophus arizonellus is a moth of the family Acrolophidae. It is found in North America, including Arizona and Texas.

References

Moths described in 1887
arizonellus